Florian Iberer (born 7 December 1982) is an Austrian former professional ice hockey Defenseman.

Playing career
Iberer began his career playing for the Graz 99ers where he played from 1999 to 2005.  He then moved to the United States, playing in the United Hockey League for the Elmira Jackals and the Quad City Mallards, the ECHL with the Alaska Aces and the International Hockey League with the Kalamazoo Wings before moving back to Austria in 2007 with Black Wings Linz. After playing two seasons for the EHC Black Wings Linz he moved back to Graz to play for his home team, before enjoying a tenure with EC KAC.

On June 22, 2014, Iberer joined his fourth Austrian club as a free agent, signing a one-year contract with the Vienna Capitals. After two seasons with the Capitals, Iberer was not re-signed by the club and initially agreed to a contract with KS Cracovia of the Polska Hokej Liga on August 13, 2016.

One month on from signing in Poland, Iberer opted to leave before opening of the season to return to North America for the first time since 2008, agreeing to a one-year deal with the Reading Royals of the ECHL on September 14, 2016. In his lone season with the Royals in 2016–17, Iberer led the blueline in scoring with 41 points in 70 games.

As a free agent, Iberer opted to return home to his original club in Graz 99ers, agreeing to a two-year deal on May 4, 2017.

Career statistics

Regular season and playoffs

International

References

External links

1982 births
Alaska Aces (ECHL) players
Austrian ice hockey defencemen
Dresdner Eislöwen players
EHC Black Wings Linz players
Elmira Jackals (ECHL) players
Graz 99ers players
HC Litvínov players
Ice hockey players at the 2014 Winter Olympics
IF Troja/Ljungby players
Living people
Kalamazoo Wings (UHL) players
EC KAC players
Olympic ice hockey players of Austria
Reading Royals players
Sportspeople from Graz
Quad City Mallards (UHL) players
Újpesti TE (ice hockey) players
VEU Feldkirch players
Vienna Capitals players
Austrian expatriate sportspeople in Germany
Austrian expatriate sportspeople in the United States
Austrian expatriate sportspeople in Sweden
Austrian expatriate sportspeople in the Czech Republic
Austrian expatriate sportspeople in Hungary
Expatriate ice hockey players in Germany
Expatriate ice hockey players in the United States
Expatriate ice hockey players in Sweden
Expatriate ice hockey players in the Czech Republic
Expatriate ice hockey players in Hungary
Austrian expatriate ice hockey people